Bykovsky (masculine), Bykovskaya (feminine), or Bykovskoye (neuter) may refer to:
Bykovsky District, a district of Volgograd Oblast, Russia
Bykovsky (rural locality), name of several rural localities in Russia
Bykovsky channel, a major distributary of the Lena River
Bykovsky (surname)

See also
 
 Bykovo (disambiguation)
 Bykowski, a surname